Alder Grange School is a secondary school and sixth form located in the east Lancashire town of Rawtenstall, England.

Facilities 
The school's sporting facilities include a gymnasium, a 3G pitch with astroturf, and Alder Grange Sports Centre - a fitness room with sports hall. The sports hall opened in 2008 which includes various facilities which include badminton courts, table tennis tables, outdoor football space and basketball courts.

Elsewhere, the school has one cafeteria, three science labs, two specialised technology rooms including a kitchen for food technology, a music room and one IT suite.

The school is closely linked to school technology provider Promethean and has taken part in trials of new products, as well as frequently using current ones in day-to-day lessons. Many products that were tested were the Promethean ActivBoard pens and ActiVote units.  At this current moment of time, Alder Grange have stopped taking part in trials for Promethean however, they still utilise their equipment in the classroom.

Awards and status 
It previously held special school status as a Technology College (since 1993) and a second award in Applied Learning. In 2007 it was designated a High Performing Special School. The special school programme ended in 2013. However, in late 2019, Alder Grange received a Special School recognition award.

Extra curricular activities 
Apart from academic work, students at Alder Grange can participate in other activities. These include the Music School (includes extra instrument lessons or taking part in school productions such as a rendition of Grease) and formerly the Duke of Edinburgh award scheme (bronze to silver).

ag6 
In January 2011, Alder Grange School opened its new sixth form centre for 16- to 18-year-olds, giving its students an easier choice when they carry on full-time education after 16. The building had a construction cost of £6 million, and offers around 100 student places per academic year.

Facilities 
Facilities at the new ag6 building includes a catering kitchen and café, media studio  and PC computers with professional-spec camera equipment, one science laboratory, a student social area with library, staff lounge and horticulture equipment.

Courses 
At ag6, students can take academic A levels, vocational BTEC (or similar) qualifications, or a mixture of both. Courses available include classic academic courses such as English literature, mathematics, sociology, the law, to vocational ones such as performing arts and creative media.

Controversy
In November 2014, a supply teacher, 49-year-old David Simpson, was convicted of sending explicit pictures of himself to girls under the age of 16. He was also convicted of grooming them and trying to meet them at times for sexual intercourse. After a trial at Burnley Crown Court, he received a 12-month sentence, suspended for two years.

In April 2021, Alder Grange had four benches stolen from the school site. The benches were used by staff to have lunch outdoors due to the COVID pandemic. As a result of the theft, Alder Grange created a JustGiving page to fundraise the benches' replacement. A total of £1,250 was raised by the community.

Arizona

In 2014, a girl band from Alder Grange, named Arizona, released a single entitled 'Electricity', in order to raise money for Petal Cancer Research. The band comprises year 11 opera singer Grace O'Malley and sixth form students Jess Haworth, Sophie Wooding and Jess Watts.

After the release of the single, the band went on a tour across the north of England, from 11 July 2014 until 18 July 2014. This involved performing to over 20,000 people at venues such as the Cancer Research UK Race for Life event in Ilkley, Yorkshire, town fêtes, and primary and high schools in the area.

Alderbeat Records
Alderbeat Records was launched in February 2012 after the school purchased high-end radio equipment. As part of the project, a school station called Alderbeat was broadcast on 87.9FM and was played in the school via a number of speakers around the school including classrooms. The station manager was an Alder Grange student.

Arizona's debut single was released in 2014 under the supervision of the Alderbeat Records record label.

Alderbeat was discontinued in March 2017 as many people weren't tuning in.

References

External links
Alder Grange School website
Alder Grange Six Form website

Schools in the Borough of Rossendale
Secondary schools in Lancashire
Community schools in Lancashire